Church of the Holy Cross (Sourp khach) is an Armenian Catholic Church in the Ouroubeh district of Aleppo, Syria.

Overview
The consecration of the church took place on 24 April 1993, on the 78 anniversary of the Armenian genocide. It is the work of the Aleppine-Armenian architect Sarkis Balmanougian. The church has a single dome with a belfry at the entrance.

During the Syrian Civil War and after the break-up of the Battle of Aleppo in 2012, the seat of the Armenian Catholic Archeparchy of Aleppo was temporarily moved to the Holy Cross Church, as the original seat of the diocese the Cathedral of Our Mother of Reliefs was frequently being shelled by the Islamist rebels.

As of April 2010, Father Nerses Zabbarian is the parish priest of Holy Cross church.

Gallery

See also
Armenians in Syria
Armenian Catholic Church

References

Cross
Armenian Catholic churches in Syria